Birmingham City Police was the police service  responsible for general policing in the city of Birmingham from 1839 to 1974. The force was established by a special Act of Parliament in 1839, and was amalgamated as of 1 April 1974 with the West Midlands Constabulary and parts of other forces to form the West Midlands Police by the Local Government Act 1972.

History

Early history 

As early as 1786, watchmen were paid to patrol the streets at night, although this seems to have lapsed on occasion. Special constables were sworn in when required.

In 1800, James Bisset wrote:

In 1812, Joseph Chirm was the "Head Borough Constable".

Birmingham Town Police

Following Chartist rioting in 1839, when one hundred police had to be brought from London, an Act of Parliament was passed on 26 August 1839 "for improving the Police in Birmingham". Birmingham was required to have at least 250 constables and 50 officers,  funded by a rate imposed on the town of Birmingham, but serving all of Warwickshire, Worcestershire and Staffordshire. A commissioner was to be appointed by the Home Secretary and report to him. The Birmingham force came into being on 20 November 1839 with 260 men. Francis Burgess, a local barrister, was appointed as the first police commissioner for Birmingham. On 12 August 1842 a new Police Act transferred responsibility to the Birmingham Town Council and another removed doubts as to the authority of the council. Burgess was succeeded by Richard Stephens, as the first Superintendent of the Birmingham Borough Police.

Birmingham City Police
When Birmingham became a city in 1889 the town police became the Birmingham City Police.

World War I 

Five hundred and seventy one officers from Birmingham City Police served in the military during World War I, of whom 50 were killed. All 571 are named on a memorial which is located in Lloyd House, the headquarters of the BCP's successor, the West Midlands Police, and on an accompanying website.

Band 

The Birmingham City Police Band was, at one period, conducted by Appleby Matthews, organist of the city's St. Philip's Cathedral and the first conductor of the City of Birmingham Orchestra (later the City of Birmingham Symphony Orchestra). Members of the band would sometimes supplement the orchestra's numbers. Subsequently The band was conducted by Richard Wassell, with whom they performed a number of BBC Radio broadcasts.
 
The City of Birmingham Orchestra held its first-ever rehearsal at 9.30am on 4 September 1920, in the band room at the Birmingham City Police's Steelhouse Lane station.

Chief Constables

Chief Constables of Birmingham City Police (some under other titles) included:

References

Further reading

External links 

 Birmingham Police Bill 1839 on Hansard
 Birmingham Police parade, circa 1914-1918 (Pathé newsreel)
 The Man on the Beat 1945 British Council film about UK policing, made in central Birmingham

 
Defunct police forces of England